Edwardsville is a city in and the county seat of Madison County, Illinois, United States. As of the 2020 census, the population was 26,808. The city was named in honor of Ninian Edwards, then Governor of the Illinois Territory.

Southern Illinois University Edwardsville, the Edwardsville Arts Center, the Edwardsville Journal, the Madison County Record, and the Edwardsville Intelligencer are based here. Edwardsville High School and Metro-East Lutheran High School serve students in the area. Edwardsville also serves as the headquarters for Prairie Farms Dairy one of the largest dairy cooperatives in the United States and ranked in the top 10 of the largest privately held companies in the St. Louis region. 

It is part of the Edwardsville School District, which also includes the villages of Glen Carbon, Hamel and Moro, as well as the township areas around them.

History
Edwardsville was incorporated in 1818. The first European-American settler was Thomas Kirkpatrick, who came in 1805, laid out a community, and served as the Justice of the Peace. He named the community after his friend Ninian Edwards, then territorial governor of Illinois. (Illinois did not become a state until 1818.) The Edwards Trace, a key trail in the settlement of Central Illinois, used Edwardsville as a northward launching point.

In 1868 The Bank of Edwardsville was founded. It was purchased by Champaign, Illinois-based Busey Bank in 2019.

In 1890, St. Louis industrialist N.O. Nelson chose a tract of land just south of Edwardsville to build plumbing factories. He also built a model workers' cooperative village called Leclaire. He offered workers fair wages with reasonable working hours and a share of the profits. He named the village in honor of the French economist Edme-Jean Leclaire. The village also provided educational and recreational opportunities and made it financially possible for anyone to own a home. Unlike company towns such as Pullman near Chicago, the welfare and quality of life for the workers and their families was a major concern.

In 1934, the Village of Leclaire was incorporated into the City of Edwardsville. The area has a lake and park, baseball field, and the Edwardsville Children's Museum in the former Rudolph D. Specht memorial schoolhouse. Several Nelson factory buildings were renovated and adapted for use as the historic N. O. Nelson Campus of Lewis and Clark Community College. The recognized Historic District has been listed on the National Register of Historic Places.

Each year on the third Sunday in October, the Friends of Leclaire host the annual Leclaire Parkfest with food, live heritage music, historic displays & tours, artisans, children's activities, a book sale, and more.

In 1983, Edwardsville's historic Saint Louis Street was also listed on the National Register of Historic Places. Dating back to 1809, this Historic District has a mile-long visual landscape. More than 50 historic homes date from the middle 19th century to early 20th century. The protection and preservation of Saint Louis Street is overseen by the Historic Saint Louis Street Association.

Five Illinois governors came from Edwardsville: namesake Ninian Edwards, who became a territorial governor in 1809 and later served as governor from 1826 to 1830; Edward Coles, elected in 1822 and a strong opponent of slavery; John Reynolds, governor from 1830 to 1834; Thomas Ford, governor from 1842 to 1846; and Charles Deneen, governor from 1909 to 1913.

Former president Abraham Lincoln was in Edwardsville twice, as an attorney in the 1814 courthouse and a speaker outside the 1857 courthouse on Sept. 11, 1858. The present county courthouse, a square, four-story neoclassical structure of white marble that rises to six stories at the back section, was constructed from 1913 to 1915.

A 2010 issue of Family Circle magazine named Edwardsville third of their "Top 10 Best Towns for Families".

Edwardsville was heavily affected by the tornado outbreak of December 10–11, 2021. An Amazon warehouse collapsed after being hit by an EF3 tornado and six workers were killed and many others injured.

Geography and climate

Climate Zone 4A per the International Energy Conservation Code.

Demographics

As of the census of 2020, 26,808 people,  8,814 households, and 5,291 families resided in the city. The city's racial makeup was 87.70% White, 8.66% African American, 1.69% Asian, 0.28% Native American, 0.03% Pacific Islander, 0.29% from other races, and 1.35% from two or more races. Hispanic or Latino of any race were 1.00% of the population.
        
There were 10,000 households, out of which 32.8% had children under the age of 18 living with them, 52.4% were married couples living together, 9.9% had a female householder with no husband present, and 34.8% were non-families. 25.9% of all households were made up of individuals, and 8.7% had someone living alone who was 65 years of age or older. The average household size was 2.44, and the average family size was 2.99.

The population was spread out, with 22.6% under the age of 18, 16.0% from 18 to 24, 29.4% from 25 to 44, 20.3% from 45 to 64, and 11.7% who were 65 years of age or older. The median age was 33 years. For every 100 females, there were 87.5 males. For every 100 females age 18 and over, there were 83.3 males.

The city's median household income was $50,921, and the median family income was $65,555. Males had a median income of $47,045 versus $29,280 for females. The city's per capita income was $26,510. About 5.0% of families and 8.6% of the population were below the poverty line, including 7.3% of those under age 18 and 6.0% of those age 65 or over.

Parks and recreation
The trails are mostly asphalt. Maps of the trails, which connect to neighborhoods, schools, business districts, SIUE, parks, and more, are available on kiosks throughout the trail system or online at www.mcttrails.org.
Watershed Nature Center:  wildlife preserve. The interpretive center displays native Illinois plants and animals and has education about the environment. Programming for children and adults is available.
The property includes rolling hills, acres of forests, and extensive fields.
Edwardsville Parks: Plummer Family Park, Winston Brown Sports Complex, Vadalabene Park, Brent Leh Dog Park, Springer Woods, Hoppe Park, Leon Corlew Splash Pad, RP Lumber Center, Leclaire Field, Joe Glik Park, City Park, Edwardsville Township Park, Leclaire Park, Lusk Memorial Park, and Rotary Park.
Arts & Culture: Edwardsville Arts Center, Wildey Theater, Edwardsville Children's Museum, Madison County Historical Museum, Mannie Jackson Center for the Humanities.
Lakes: Leclaire Lake, Dunlap Lake, and Tower Lake.

Media

Print
Daily newspaper: The Edwardsville Intelligencer (daily and Saturday only)

Radio
WSIE-FM 88.7, radio station of Southern Illinois University Edwardsville.
WRYT-AM 1080, religious programming (Covenant Network—Roman Catholic).
Edwardsville is also served by most St. Louis, Missouri, radio stations.

Television
ECTV Channel 10, local channel available on Charter Cable in Glen Carbon and Edwardsville.

Pop culture
Scenes for the movie The Lucky Ones, starring Tim Robbins and Rachel McAdams, were filmed in downtown Edwardsville in June 2007. However, the scene filmed was set in Denver, Colorado, and banners were hung on Edwardsville's Main Street that read, "Welcome to Denver."

Singer-songwriter Jackson Browne recorded "Cocaine" and "Shaky Town" in Edwardsville's Holiday Inn Room 124 for his album Running on Empty. The Holiday Inn at 3080 S. Route 157 was torn down and rebuilt as a Comfort Suites.

A collection of poetry by Nigerian writer Kọ́lá Túbọ̀sún, Edwardsville by Heart (Wisdom's Bottom Press, November 2018), was based on the time the author spent in Edwardsville for three years as a Fulbright Scholar and student. The book was described by Howard Rambsy II of Southern Illinois University Edwardsville as “an artistic map disguised as a volume of poetry”, and by Ainehi Edoro, writing in Brittle Paper, as "a magical meeting place of travelogue, memoir, and poetry."

An episode of the TV series House Hunters was filmed in Edwardsville and aired in January 2018. The episode featured a local couple, Zach and Hannah, who grew up and went to school in Edwardsville.

Notable people 

 John Hicks Adams, gunslinger and Wild West lawman
William H. Berry, Treasurer of Pennsylvania, Mayor of Chester, Pennsylvania
 John Bischoff, Major League Baseball player
 Max L. Bowler, Illinois state representative
 Evelyn M. Bowles, Illinois state senator
 Hedy Burress, actress (He's Just Not That Into You, Foxfire, If These Walls Could Talk, and Valentine)
 Edward Coles, businessman and the second governor of Illinois
 Charles S. Deneen, US senator and the 23rd governor of Illinois
 Ninian Edwards, US senator, judge, governor of the Illinois Territory, and the third governor of Illinois;  Edwardsville is named after him.
 A. J. Epenesa, Professional Football player for the NFL.  Drafted no. 54 overall in the 2020 NFL Draft by the Buffalo Bills
 Thomas Ford, Illinois Supreme Court judge, author, and the eighth governor of Illinois
 Earl E. Herrin, Illinois state representative
 Jason Isringhausen, pitcher with five MLB teams; lived in Edwardsville
 Mannie Jackson, chairman and CEO of the Harlem Globetrotters; purchased the team in 1993
 Thomas Judy, Illinois legislator
 Charles E. Lippincott, California State Senator and Illinois Auditor
 Mark Little, outfielder with five Major League Baseball teams; born in Edwardsville
 José Martínez, first baseman/outfielder for the New York Mets; Lived in Edwardsville
 Laurie Metcalf, actress (Jackie Harris on Roseanne)
 Joseph P. Newsham, lawyer and US congressman from Louisiana
 Billie Poole, jazz singer
 John Reynolds, speaker of the Illinois House, US congressman, Illinois Supreme Court justice, and the fourth governor of Illinois
 AJ Schnack, director of Kurt Cobain: About a Son
 Jesse L. Simpson, Chief Justice of the Illinois Supreme Court
James W. Stephenson, American militia officer and politician from the state of Illinois. He was born in Virginia but spent most of his youth in Edwardsville.
 Sam M. Vadalabene, Illinois state legislator
 Lee Wheat, pitcher for the Philadelphia Athletics and Kansas City Athletics; born in Edwardsville
 Rudolph G. Wilson, first black school board member/president in the city's history and educational leader for more than 45 years.

See also

Benjamin Stephenson House

References

External links
City of Edwardsville website
Edwardsville Public Library
Edwardsville Intelligencer newspaper website
Leclaire National Historic District
Historic Saint Louis Street Association
Edwardsville Arts Center
Edwardsville, IL on Weather Underground, Local Weather Information
"Edwardsville's first modern house", about The Griffin House
Metro-East Lutheran High School, A Lutheran Church–Missouri Synod high school

 
Cities in Illinois
Cities in Madison County, Illinois
County seats in Illinois
Populated places established in 1818
1818 establishments in Illinois Territory